Ras-e Jonubi (also Romanized as Ra’s-e Jonūbī; also known as Būzeh Rāsat (Persian: بوزه راست) and Raddeh-ye ‘Āmerī) is a village in Jazireh-ye Minu Rural District, Minu District, Khorramshahr County, Khuzestan Province, Iran. At the 2006 census, its population was 220, in 45 families.

References 

Populated places in Khorramshahr County